This is a list of places, buildings, roads and other things named for King Abdullah II. It is divided by category, though each item's location is noted in the entry.

Institutions
 King Abdullah Design and Development Bureau

Buildings
 King Abdullah II Stadium

Abdullah II